The Voices of Mars is a 1957 children's science fiction novel by Patrick Moore, published by Burke. It is the third of a six-book series based on the character Maurice Gray.

Plot synopsis
Some years after the events described in Mission to Mars, and The Domes of Mars, Maurice Gray and his friend Bruce Talbot are now permanent members of the research colony established on Mars. They learn from a new arrival that the United Nations, which funds the base, is having second thoughts about its viability.

Many of the colonists have been so long on Mars that their muscles have become acclimatised to the low gravity conditions and they would be unlikely to survive long under Earth conditions. Nevertheless, they decide to send an 'embassy' (the Voices) to Earth to plead their cause. Maurice, his uncle Leslie Yorke, and Bruce Talbot make the trip.

Whilst in Earth orbit, they hear on radio a debate at the United National Scientific Council, which has been hijacked by a few self-serving politicians. The crew decide to land and try to address the debate. Despite being badly affected by Earth gravity and heat, they make it to the debating chamber. Maurice manages to convey his opinions on the importance of the Mars colony to the delegates, before collapsing. They are conveyed back to the spaceship and leave Earth.

They later learn that attempts to close the base have been defeated.

See also

Mission to Mars, 1955, the first book in the Maurice Gray series

References

1957 British novels
1957 science fiction novels
British science fiction novels
Children's science fiction novels
Novels set on Mars